Kamaby  is a town and sub-prefecture in the Koundara Prefecture in the Boké Region of northern Guinea, near the borders of Guinea-Bissau and Senegal. As of 2014 it had a population of 16,178 people.

References

Sub-prefectures of the Boké Region